Sir Alexander Mackenzie Secondary is a public high school in Hagensborg, British Columbia part of School District 49 Central Coast.  It was named after the Scottish-Canadian explorer Sir Alexander MacKenzie, who was the first European to reach the Pacific Ocean overland.

External links
Ministry of Education school information

High schools in British Columbia
Educational institutions established in 1949
1949 establishments in British Columbia